Ethmia chrysopyga is a moth of the family Depressariidae. It is found in southern Europe and Anatolia up to the Caucasus region.

The forewings are dull black, with three intensely black spots, the first two situated very lightly before the middle, one on the middle of the fold, one on the cell directly above it, and the third slightly larger spot at the upper angle of the cell. The hindwings are sooty black and a little paler than the forewings.

Subspecies
Ethmia chrysopyga chrysopyga (western Europe)
Ethmia chrysopyga andalusica (Staudinger, 1880) (Spain, Portugal)
Ethmia chrysopyga staudingeri (Rebel, 1901) (Asia Minor)

References

chrysopyga
Moths of Europe
Insects of Turkey
Moths described in 1844